Geniostoma huttonii  is a flowering plant in the Loganiaceae family. The specific epithet honours Ian Hutton who discovered the species in the course of his explorations of the Island.

Description
It is a scrambling shrub, growing to 1 m in height. The ovate leaves are 2–3 cm long and 1–1.6 cm wide. The inflorescence is less than 1 cm long, bearing 1–3 very small flowers.

Distribution and habitat
The plant is endemic to Australia’s subtropical Lord Howe Island in the Tasman Sea. It is rare and very local, being known only from the slopes of Mount Lidgbird.

References

huttonii
Endemic flora of Lord Howe Island
Laurales of Australia
Plants described in 1993